The Miller Medal is an award of the Royal Society of Canada given for outstanding research in any branch of the earth sciences. The award consists of a gold-plated silver medal and is awarded every two years if there is a suitable candidate.

In 1941, twelve friends of Willet Green Miller, FRSC (1867–1925), a distinguished geologist, and a guiding force in the development of the Ontario mining industry, subscribed funds to provide the Willet G. Miller Medal for geology.

Award winners
Source: Royal Society of Canada
2022 - Donald B. Dingwell, FRSC
2022 - Kimberly Strong, FRSC
2020 - Alfonso Mucci, FRSC
2020 - Barbara Sherwood Lollar, FRSC
2018 - Ann Gargett, FRSC
2018 - Raymond A. Price, FRSC
2016 - , MRSC
2011 - Anthony E. Williams-Jones, FRSC
2009 - R. Paul Young, FRSC
2007 - Frederick John Longstaffe
2005 - Kurt Kyser, FRSC
2003 - Roger H. Mitchell, FRSC
2001 - Robert L. Carroll, FRSC
1999 - Robert Kerrich
1997 - Paul F. Hoffman
1995 - Hans J. Hofmann
1993 - Frank C. Hawthorne, FRSC
1991 - Jan Veizer, FRSC
1989 - William H. Mathews, FRSC
1987 - Harold Williams, FRSC
1985 - William S. Fyfe, FRSC
1983 - Donald F. Stott
1981 - Denis M. Shaw, FRSC
1979 - Edward T. Tozer
1977 - Allan M. Goodwin
1975 - J. Ross Mackay
1973 - Raymond Thorsteinsson
1971 - Robert W. Boyle
1969 - J.A. Jeletzky
1967 - Robert E. Folinsbee
1965 - R. J. W. Douglas, FRSC
1963 - Leonard G. Berry
1961 - William H. White
1959 - Loris S. Russell
1957 - James E. Gill
1955 - John Tuzo Wilson
1953 - Clifford H. Stockwell
1951 - James Edwin Hawley
1949 - Hardy V. Ellsworth
1947 - Frank H. McLearn, FRSC
1945 - Morley E. Wilson, FRSC
1943 - Norman Levi Bowen, FRSC

See also
 List of geographers
 List of earth sciences awards
 List of geology awards
 List of awards named after people

References

Canadian science and technology awards
Royal Society of Canada
Awards established in 1941
Geology awards
Earth sciences awards